Lost is the second and final album by American rock band RTZ. It was released in 1998 by MTM Music and Avalon Japan. It was reissued in 2000 with a bonus track, and again in 2005 under the title Lost in America.

Track listing
All songs written by Delp and Goudreau, except where noted.
 "When You Love Someone" – 4:34
 "Turn This Love Around" (Delp, Goudreau, Stefanelli, Troy) – 4:16
 "Someday" – 4:19
 "Violent Days" – 4:07
 "Change for Change" – 3:59
 "One in a Million" – 4:34
 "Given You Up for Dead" – 4:24
 "Don't Wait" – 4:46
 "Talk to Me" – 4:40
 "Don't Lead Me On" – 4:23
 "Dangerous"* – 4:04
 Track 11 is a bonus track that was added in 2000 and subsequent reissues.

Personnel
 Brad Delp: Lead & backing vocals
 Barry Goudreau: Electric & acoustic guitars, backing vocals
 Brian Maes: Keyboards, piano, backing vocals
 Tim Archibald: Bass
 David Stefanelli: Drums, percussion

Production
 Produced & Engineered By Barry Goudreau
 Mastered By Henk Kooistra

1999 albums